The Women's 10 kilometre marathon competition at the 2017 Summer Universiade was held on 27 August 2017.

Results 
The race was started at 6:15.

References

Women's 10 kilometre marathon